Kevin Marfo (born May 26, 1997) is an American professional basketball player for Fortitudo Agrigento in Italy's Serie A2 league. He played college basketball at several universities, including Quinnipiac, George Washington and Texas A&M. He was the NCAA Division I season rebounds leader in 2019–20.

High school career
Marfo played for Bergen Catholic High School in Oradell, New Jersey before transferring to Worcester Academy in Worcester, Massachusetts for his final two high school years. In his senior season, he was team captain and averaged 17 points and 12 rebounds per game. Marfo played for The City AAU team alongside Donovan Mitchell. On October 9, 2015, he committed to George Washington over offers from Providence and Boston College.

College career
As a freshman, Marfo came off the bench for George Washington and averaged 2.7 points and 2.8 rebounds in 8.9 minutes per game. He scored a season-high 18 points on December 4, 2016 in a loss to Florida State. On March 23, 2017, Marfo requested his release from George Washington. He sat out his next season to transfer to Quinnipiac. 

As a redshirt sophomore, Marfo averaged 5.4 points and 7.5 rebounds per game. On January 13, 2020, as a junior, Marfo was named Metro Atlantic Athletic Conference (MAAC) Player of the Week after recording a career-high 21 rebounds, along with 13 points and five assists, in a win over Monmouth. He finished the season averaging 13.3 rebounds per game, which led all NCAA Division I players, as well as 10.2 points, 1.9 assists and 1.2 blocks per game. He grabbed at least 10 rebounds in all but one of 30 games. Marfo earned second-team All-MAAC honors. 

After his junior season, Marfo announced that was transferring from Quinnipiac. On March 28, 2020, he committed to play for Texas A&M as a senior. He was immediately eligible as a graduate transfer. After the season, Marfo announced that he would return to Quinnipiac. As a sixth-year senior, Marfo averaged a MAAC-best 10.2 rebounds per game to go along with 9.4 points per game, earning a spot on the All-MAAC Second Team for the second time in his career.

Professional career
Marfo went undrafted in the 2022 NBA draft. In July 2022, he signed his first professional contract with Fortitudo Agrigento in Italy's Serie A2 league.

Career statistics

College

|-
| style="text-align:left;"| 2016–17
| style="text-align:left;"| George Washington
| 23 || 0 || 8.9 || .364 || – || .536 || 2.8 || .2 || .3 || .3 || 2.7
|-
| style="text-align:left;"| 2017–18
| style="text-align:left;"| Quinnipiac
| style="text-align:center;" colspan="11"|  Redshirt
|-
| style="text-align:left;"| 2018–19
| style="text-align:left;"| Quinnipiac
| 25 || 11 || 18.5 || .488 || – || .632 || 7.5 || .9 || .2 || .5 || 5.4
|-
| style="text-align:left;"| 2019–20
| style="text-align:left;"| Quinnipiac
| 30 || 29 || 28.1 || .484 || .333 || .710 || style="background:#cfecec;" | 13.3* || 1.9 || .6 || 1.2 || 10.2
|-
| style="text-align:left;"| 2020–21
| style="text-align:left;"| Texas A&M
| 17 || 8 || 12.8 || .464 || .000 || .704 || 3.7 || .3 || .6 || .4 || 2.6
|-
| style="text-align:left;"| 2021–22
| style="text-align:left;"| Quinnipiac
| 31 || 31 || 26.8 || .467 || .067 || .715 || 10.2 || 3.9 || .9 || .7 || 9.4
|- class="sortbottom"
| style="text-align:center;" colspan="2"| Career
| 126 || 79 || 20.3 || .467 || .105 || .676 || 8.2 || 1.7 || .6 || .7 || 6.7

Personal life
Both of Marfo's parents are originally from Ghana. His father Joseph and mother Sandra are from the cities of Accra and Kumasi, respectively. Marfo has two older sisters, Ashley and Mikita.

References

External links
College statistics @ sports-reference.com
Quinnipiac Bobcats bio

1997 births
Living people
American expatriate basketball people in Italy
American men's basketball players
American sportspeople of Ghanaian descent
Basketball players from New York City
Bergen Catholic High School alumni
Fortitudo Agrigento players
George Washington Colonials men's basketball players
Power forwards (basketball)
Quinnipiac Bobcats men's basketball players
Sportspeople from Brooklyn
Texas A&M Aggies men's basketball players
Worcester Academy alumni